The Baron and the Kid is an 1984 American made-for-television Drama film starring Johnny Cash. The film was directed by Gary Nelson.

Plot 
William “The Baron” Addington (Johnny Cash) is a former pool pro whose lifetime of drinking has cost him his career and family. Trying to set himself straight, he quits drinking and begins to play pool for charity.

When William comes across a young man named Billy Joe Stanley (Greg Webb) managed by Jack Streamer (Darren McGavin), the two team up.

A series of chance revelations leads William to discover that Billy is his son.

The two join a tournament before William reveals his true identity as Billy’s father.

Cast

Production 
Production was carried out by Gary Nelson.  The movie was filmed in Atlanta,Georgia, as well as Norcross, Georgia, with scenes filmed in Cedartown.

Reception 
The movie received mostly positive reviews, receiving an 87% on Rotten Tomatoes and a 69% on Metacritic.

References

Citations

General references (sources)
"The Mmovie Scene

1984 television films